University High School (UHS) is a small independent college preparatory school. The school is located in Carmel, Indiana. University's campus is 115 acres and consists of two buildings, Fairbanks Hall and Andrews Hall. It consists of athletic fields and a tennis complex. They also have a computer laboratory, multiple science labs, a theater, a gymnasium, and music and art facilities.

Athletics
University's sport teams include: girls Volleyball, girls and boys Golf, girls and boys Soccer, girls and boys Tennis, girls and boys Basketball, Cheerleading, Cross country running, Track and field athletics, swimming, girls Softball, and boys Baseball. 

Athletic accomplishments of the Trailblazers include:
 2005 ICST Boys' Basketball State Champions
 2006 IHSAA Boys Basketball Sectional Champions
 2008 IHSAA Girls Basketball Sectional, Regional, and Semi-State Champions
 2009 IHSAA Girls Basketball Sectional and Regional Champions
 2010 IHSAA Girls Basketball Sectional Champions
 2012 IHSAA Girls Basketball Sectional Champions
 2012 IHSAA Boys Basketball Sectional Champions
 2012 IHSAA Baseball Sectional Champions
 2013 IHSAA Boys Basketball Sectional and Regional Champions
 2013 IHSAA Boys Baseball Sectional Champions
 2018 IHSAA Girls Basketball 1A Sectional Champions 
 2018 IHSAA Boys Basketball 1A Sectional Champions 
 2018 IHSAA Boys Soccer 1A Sectional Champions
 2018 IHSAA Girls Soccer 1A Sectional Champions 
 2018 IHSAA Girls Volleyball 1A Sectional Champions 
 2018 IHSAA Boys Baseball 1A State Runner-up
 2019 IHSAA Girls Soccer 1A Sectional Champions 
 2019 IHSAA Girls Basketball 1A Sectional and Regional Champions 
 2019 IHSAA Boys 1A Boys Baseball State Champions
 2021 IHSAA Girls Basketball 2A Sectional and Regional Champions
 2021 IHSAA Boys Baseball 2A Sectional and Regional Champions 
 2022 IHSAA Girls Basketball 2A Sectional and Regional Champions 
 2022 IHSAA Boys Basketball 2A Sectional Champions

See also
 List of high schools in Indiana

References

External links
 University High School Home Page

2000 establishments in Indiana
Educational institutions established in 2000
Preparatory schools in Indiana
Private high schools in Indiana
Schools in Hamilton County, Indiana
Carmel, Indiana